William Block may refer to:

 Bill Block (William Hunt Block, born 1954), American film producer
 Billy Block (William Donald Block, 1955–2015), American musician, journalist and radio personality

See also
 William H. Block Co., a department store chain in Indiana